The 6th Congress of the Russian Social Democratic Labour Party (bolsheviks) was held during 26 July – 3 August (N.S. 8–16 August) 1917 in Petrograd, Russia. It elected the 6th Central Committee.

Held semi-legally in between the February and October revolutions, this was the first congress to take place in Russia since the initial congress and the last not to be held in Moscow. The party merged with the Mezhraiontsy.

See also 
July Days

References

Russian Social Democratic Labor Party 6
Congress
1917 conferences
July 1917 events
August 1917 events